The ouroboros or uroboros is an ancient symbol depicting a serpent or dragon eating its own tail. The ouroboros entered Western tradition via ancient Egyptian iconography and the Greek magical tradition. It was adopted as a symbol in Gnosticism and Hermeticism and most notably in alchemy. The term derives , from  oura 'tail' plus  -boros '-eating'. The ouroboros is often interpreted as a symbol for eternal cyclic renewal or a cycle of life, death, and rebirth; the snake's skin-sloughing symbolises the transmigration of souls. The snake biting its own tail is a fertility symbol in some religions: the tail is a phallic symbol and the mouth is a yonic or womb-like symbol.

Some snakes, such as rat snakes, have been known to consume themselves. One captive snake attempted to consume itself twice, dying in the second attempt. Another wild rat snake was found having swallowed about two-thirds of its body.

Historical representations

Ancient Egypt 
One of the earliest known ouroboros motifs is found in the Enigmatic Book of the Netherworld, an ancient Egyptian funerary text in KV62, the tomb of Tutankhamun, in the 14th century BCE. The text concerns the actions of the Ra and his union with Osiris in the underworld. The ouroboros is depicted twice on the figure: holding their tails in their mouths, one encircling the head and upper chest, the other surrounding the feet of a large figure, which may represent the unified Ra-Osiris (Osiris born again as Ra). Both serpents are manifestations of the deity Mehen, who in other funerary texts protects Ra in his underworld journey. The whole divine figure represents the beginning and the end of time.

The ouroboros appears elsewhere in Egyptian sources, where, like many Egyptian serpent deities, it represents the formless disorder that surrounds the orderly world and is involved in that world's periodic renewal. The symbol persisted from Egyptian into Roman times, when it frequently appeared on magical talismans, sometimes in combination with other magical emblems. The 4th-century CE Latin commentator Servius was aware of the Egyptian use of the symbol, noting that the image of a snake biting its tail represents the cyclical nature of the year.

China 
An early example of an ouroboros (as a purely artistic representation) was discovered in China, on a piece of pottery in the Yellow River basin. The jar belonged to the neolithic Yangshao culture which occupied the area along the basin from 5000 to 3000 BCE.

Gnosticism and alchemy 

In Gnosticism, a serpent biting its tail symbolised eternity and the soul of the world. The Gnostic Pistis Sophia (c. 400 CE) describes the ouroboros as a twelve-part dragon surrounding the world with its tail in its mouth.

The famous ouroboros drawing from the early alchemical text, The Chrysopoeia of Cleopatra, probably originally dating to the 3rd century Alexandria, but first known in a 10th-century copy, encloses the words hen to pan, "the all is one". Its black and white halves may perhaps represent a Gnostic duality of existence, analogous to the Taoist yin and yang symbol. The chrysopoeia ouroboros of Cleopatra the Alchemist is one of the oldest images of the ouroboros to be linked with the legendary opus of the alchemists, the philosopher's stone.

A 15th-century alchemical manuscript, The Aurora Consurgens, features the ouroboros, where it is used among symbols of the sun, moon, and mercury.

World serpent in mythology 
In Norse mythology, the ouroboros appears as the serpent Jörmungandr, one of the three children of Loki and Angrboda, which grew so large that it could encircle the world and grasp its tail in its teeth. In the legends of Ragnar Lodbrok, such as Ragnarssona þáttr, the Geatish king Herraud gives a small lindworm as a gift to his daughter Þóra Town-Hart after which it grows into a large serpent which encircles the girl's bower and bites itself in the tail. The serpent is slain by Ragnar Lodbrok who marries Þóra. Ragnar later has a son with another woman named Kráka and this son is born with the image of a white snake in one eye. This snake encircled the iris and bit itself in the tail, and the son was named Sigurd Snake-in-the-Eye.

It is a common belief among indigenous people of the tropical lowlands of South America that waters at the edge of the world-disc are encircled by a snake, often an anaconda, biting its own tail.

The ouroboros has certain features in common with the Biblical Leviathan. According to the Zohar, the Leviathan is a singular creature with no mate, "its tail is placed in its mouth", while Rashi on Baba Batra 74b describes it as "twisting around and encompassing the entire world". The identification appears to go back as far as the poems of Kalir in the 6th–7th centuries.

The Ouroboros as an auroral Phenomenon 
Following an exhaustive survey, historical linguist Marinus van der Sluijs and plasma physicist Anthony Peratt suggested that the ouroboros has a specific origin in time, in the 5th or 4th millennium BCE, and was ultimately based on globally independent observations of an intense aurora, with somewhat different characteristics than the familiar aurora. Specifically, the ouroboros could have represented an auroral oval seen as a whole, at a time when it was smaller and located closer to the equator than now. That could have been the case during geomagnetic excursions, when the geomagnetic field weakens and the earth's magnetic poles shift places. Tok Thompson and Gregory Allen Schrempp cautiously allow that this new idea might "mark a bold new interdisciplinary venture made possible by modern science".

Connection to Indian thought 
In the Aitareya Brahmana, a Vedic text of the early 1st millennium BCE, the nature of the Vedic rituals is compared to "a snake biting its own tail."

Ouroboros symbolism has been used to describe the Kundalini. According to the medieval Yoga-kundalini Upanishad: "The divine power, Kundalini, shines like the stem of a young lotus; like a snake, coiled round upon herself she holds her tail in her mouth and lies resting half asleep as the base of the body" (1.82).

Storl (2004) also refers to the ouroboros image in reference to the "cycle of samsara".

Modern references

Jungian psychology 
Swiss psychiatrist Carl Jung saw the ouroboros as an archetype and the basic mandala of alchemy. Jung also defined the relationship of the ouroboros to alchemy: Carl Jung, Collected Works, Vol. 14 para. 513.

The Jungian psychologist Erich Neumann writes of it as a representation of the pre-ego "dawn state", depicting the undifferentiated infancy experience of both humankind and the individual child.

Kekulé's dream 

The German organic chemist August Kekulé described the eureka moment when he realised the structure of benzene, after he saw a vision of Ouroboros:

I was sitting, writing at my text-book; but the work did not progress; my thoughts were elsewhere. I turned my chair to the fire and dozed. Again the atoms were gamboling before my eyes. This time the smaller groups kept modestly in the background. My mental eye, rendered more acute by the repeated visions of the kind, could now distinguish larger structures of manifold conformation: long rows, sometimes more closely fitted together; all twining and twisting in snake-like motion. But look! What was that? One of the snakes had seized hold of its own tail, and the form whirled mockingly before my eyes. As if by a flash of lightning I awoke; and this time also I spent the rest of the night in working out the consequences of the hypothesis.

Cosmos 
Martin Rees used the ouroboros to illustrate the various scales of the universe, ranging from 10−20 cm (subatomic) at the tail, up to 1025 cm (supragalactic) at the head. Rees stressed "the intimate links between the microworld and the cosmos, symbolised by the ouraborus", as tail and head meet to complete the circle.

Cybernetics 
Cybernetics deployed circular logics of causal action in the core concept of feedback in the directive and purposeful behaviour in human and living organisms, groups, and self-regulating machines. The general principle of feedback describes a circuit (electronic, social, biological, or otherwise) in which the output or result is a signal that influences the input or causal agent through its response to the new situation. W. Ross Ashby applied ideas from biology to his own work as a psychiatrist in "Design for a Brain" (1952): that living things maintain essential variables of the body within critical limits with the brain as a regulator of the necessary feedback loops. Parmar contextualises his practices as an artist in applying the cybernetic Ouroboros principle to musical improvisation.

Hence the snake eating its tail is an accepted image or metaphor in the autopoietic calculus for self-reference, or self-indication, the logical processual notation for analysing and explaining self-producing autonomous systems and "the riddle of the living", developed by Francisco Varela. Reichel describes this as:

The calculus derives from the confluence of the cybernetic logic of feedback, the sub-disciplines of autopoiesis developed by Varela and Humberto Maturana, and calculus of indications of George Spencer Brown.  In another related biological application:

Second-order cybernetics, or the cybernetics of cybernetics, applies the principle of self-referentiality, or the participation of the observer in the observed, to explore observer involvement in all behaviour and the praxis of science including D.J. Stewart's domain of "observer valued imparities".

Armadillo girdled lizard 
The genus of the armadillo girdled lizard, Ouroborus cataphractus, takes its name from the animal's defensive posture: curling into a ball and holding its own tail in its mouth.

In Iberian culture 

Dragon Gate Pro-Wrestling
The Kobe, Japan-based Dragon Gate Pro-Wrestling promotion used a stylised ouroboros as their logo for the first 20 years of the company's existence. The logo is a silhouetted dragon twisted into the shape of an infinity symbol, devouring its own tail. In 2019, the promotion dropped the infinity dragon logo in favour of a shield logo.

In fiction 
"Ouroboros" is an episode of the British science-fiction sitcom Red Dwarf, in which one character is revealed to be his own father due to time travel. The concept also features in Claire North's ‘the fifteen lives of Harry August.

The Worm Ouroboros is a high-fantasy novel written by E. R. Eddison. Much like the cyclical symbol of the ouroboros eating its own tail, the novel ends the way it begins.

The Ouroboros is used as a main plot device in Lisa Maxwell's The Last Magician series.

The main six playable characters of the video game Xenoblade Chronicles 3 are able to transform into fiercely powerful forms called Ouroboros, which are ultimately tied to the fate of their world.

The Ouroboros is the adopted symbol of the End Times-obsessed Millennium Group in the TV series Millennium. It also briefly appears when Dana Scully gets a tattoo of it in The X-Files episode "Never Again".

The Ouroboros is referenced in the science fiction short story All You Zombies by American writer Robert A. Heinlein as 'the worm Ouroboros, the world snake'. The short story later serves as inspiration for the movie Predestination (2014).

In the A Discovery of Witches novels and television adaptation, the crest of the de Clermont family is an ouroboros. The symbol plays a significant role in the alchemical plot of the story.

In The Wheel of Time, the Aes Sedai wear a "Great Serpent" ring, described as a snake consuming its own tail.   

Splatoon 3 has a similar creature, called the Horrorboros.

In the book series A Court of Thorns and Roses there is a mirror named the Ouroboros also known as the Mirror of Beginnings and Endings that shows the user who or what they truly are.

See also

References

Notes

Bibliography

External links 

 BBC Culture – The ancient symbol that spanned millennia

Ancient Egyptian symbols
Dragons
Greek dragons
European legendary creatures
Greek mythology
Greek alchemy
Legendary serpents
Mythological archetypes
Pictograms
Heraldic beasts
Visual motifs
Magic symbols
Yangshao culture